Gurdas Nangal is located in Gurdaspur tehsil in Gurdaspur district in the Indian state of Punjab. It is 6 km from the district headquarter Gurdaspur. Gurdas Nangal is also a Gram panchayat. Total population of this village 3,417 , out of which 1,767 are males and 1,650 are females.

Pin Code of this village is 143520.

References 

Villages in Gurdaspur district